Pala Leipää (A Piece of Bread) is a compilation of the Finnish metal band Waltari. This compilation was released by Stupido Records in 1993.

Track listing
 Pois (Away)	05:09	 
 Good God	04:38	  
 Aika Tulee (Time Blows)   05:01	 
 Pala Leipää (A Piece of Bread) 02:11	 
 Liisteri-Mies (Glue Man)   01:33	  
 Nakki (Sausage)	01:21	  
 Olen Seuraaja (I am a follower)   02:44	 
 Mä Haluun Elää (I wanna live)	  04:11	 
 Hippakaveri (Party Animal)	01:50	 
 Days of Distress	04:33	 
 Sad Song	05:05	  
 Rap Your Body Beat	03:50	  
 Shout   03:39	 
 Mut Hei! (But Hey!)	03:47	 
 Rasnavitsavia    02:12	 
 Icebox	04:46	 
 F.U.C.K. Rap	04:15	  
 Sillanpää (Bridge End)   03:26	 
 Tuttu Juttu (A Common Story)	02:39	 
 Kinastellaan (Let's Argue)	02:36	 
 Uhoa, Ei Tuhoa (Threat, not Destruction)	03:09

Personnel

 Kartsy Hatakka (vocals, bass, keyboards, programming)
 Jariot Lehtinen (guitar)
 Sami Yli-Sirnio (guitar)

References

1993 albums
Waltari albums